Prisad may refer to:

Places

Bulgaria
Prisad, Dobrich Province
Prisad, Burgas Province

North Macedonia
Prisad, North Macedonia
Stari Prisad, the older village of Prisad, now abandoned.

Other
Prisad Island, island off the north coast of Low Island in the South Shetland Islands